Spam Cube, Inc was a high-tech startup company based in the midtown area of New York City. The company invented and manufactured the Spam Cube, a SaaS (Security As A Service) network security hardware device for consumers that blocked spam e-mail, computer viruses and phishing. The company invented a SaaS delivery platform technology that enables any home networking embedded device such as a Broadband cable modem, DSL modem, Wireless router or Femtocell to offer network Security As A Service technology that blocks spam e-mail, computer viruses and phishing. The Spam Cube SaaS platform gave the consumer the choice to select spam e-mail, computer viruses, and phishing blocking technology that was powered by either McAfee or Symantec managed enterprise Security As A Service technology.

Trademark Issues 
In May 2006, the company ran into a costly legal battle with Hormel Foods over its trademark "Spam Cube". Hormel Foods claimed that the company's "Spam Cube" brand name was causing confusion amongst consumers and that consumers were not able to tell the difference between the Spam Cube, a cube-shaped home network security device, and Hormel's cube-shaped SPAM canned meat product. In February 2008, the company won the legal battle against Hormel Foods in the United States. The SPAM trademark dispute was widely publicized since the dispute would have forced the company into bankruptcy had Hormel Foods won.

Competitors 

Three years after Spam Cube released its technology, Cisco Systems teamed up with Trend Micro to manufacture the Linksys Home Network Defender. Linksys and Trend Micro competed directly with Spam Cube for market share in the embedded device SaaS market.

See also 
 Anti-spam appliances

References

External links
Spam Cube, Inc | Home Page
PC World - Spam Slayer: Don't Can Spam, Cube It
New York Times - On the Job, A Spam Fighter Is Learning
Picture of Spam Cube article on the front page of the March 30 edition of the New York Times
NY1 interview with David J. Soares, CBDO of Spam Cube
ABC News interview with Joseph P. Marino, CEO of Spam Cube
Spam Cube's LinkedIn Company Profile

Companies based in New York City
Networking companies of the United States
Companies established in 2003
Privately held companies based in New York (state)